Hai Phong University (abbr.: HPU) is a public university established in 1968 in Hai Phong as In-service University. In 2000, this university was merged with some other higher institutions in Hai Phong to become Hai Phong Education University. On 9 April 2004, the Prime Minister of Vietnam signed Decision 60/ 2004/ QĐ-TTg, to rename this university Hai Phong University.

Staff 
The staff of this university includes 712 (as of 2007), of which 439 are faculty staff. The faculty is composed of 1 professor, 12 Ph.Doctors, 212 masters.

Universities in Vietnam